The Komariv culture was a Bronze Age culture which flourished along the middle Dniester from 1500 BC to 1200 BC.

Few settlements from the Komariv culture have been found. One settlement at Komariv, from which the culture is named, contained twenty small single-roomed houses.

The Komariv culture is best known for its inhumation burials. These are set into a stone- or timber-covered grave covered with a tumulus. Cremations and flat grave burials are also known. Decorations found on ceramics, and the presence of stone rings and cromlechs around the base of the tumuli, indicate that a sun cult existed among the Komariv people.

The Komariv culture is believed to have originated within the Corded Ware horizon, with which is shares numerous similarities, including burial rites, ceramics and metallurgical traditions. It is closely related to the Trzciniec culture. The Komariv culture is usually associated with the evolution of the Proto-Slavs or the Thracians.

Sources

 

Bronze Age cultures of Europe
Slavic archaeological cultures
Thracian archaeological cultures